The Gift of the Magi is a chamber opera in four scenes with music by David Conte and libretto by Nicholas Giardini. Based on the 1905 short story of the same title by O. Henry, the opera focuses on Jim and Della, who are a poor married couple and cannot afford to buy each other presents for Christmas. It premiered on December 7 and 8, 1997 with a workshop production to the accompaniment of two pianos at the San Francisco Conservatory of Music. The orchestral version was premiered at the conservatory on December 3, 2000.

Roles
Jim (baritone)
Della (soprano)
Henry (bass-baritone)
Maggie (mezzo-soprano)
Magi (three voices)

Synopsis
Jim and Delia's small  flat. Christmas Eve.

Scene One: Della prepares for Christmas before Jim returns home. She lets her hair down and sings of her love and happiness. When Jim comes home, he briefly tries to entice her, then announces he has an errand to run. Being poor, Della reminds Jim, he should not get her a present for Christmas. Jim shrugs it off until she begs him to promise, then he leaves.

Scene Two: Having no money, Della calls her friend Maggie to help figure out how to buy Jim a Christmas present. Della decides in her eponymous aria to sell her hair, over Maggie’s objections. They leave to sell her hair.

Scene Three: Jim and his friend, Henry, carry in a Christmas tree. Knowing Jim’s financial situation, Henry asks how he purchased it. Jim evades the question at first but eventually tells Henry he sold the watch that once belonged to his father. Henry chides Jim for being foolish. Jim tries to explain his love for his father and his wife in the aria “Jim’s Soliloquy”.

Scene Four:  Jim and Della reunite in their flat. Each admits having broken their promise and gives the other a gift. Jim receives from Della a gold chain bought with Della's hair. Della receives ornate haircombs from Jim bought with his father's watch. They sit in melancholy silence evaluating what they have received. Their mutual sacrifice shines forth in their minds and they sing of their love and renewed fidelity.

Arias
Both "Della's Aria" and "Jim Soliloquy" can be found in E. C. Shirmer's Opera Aria Anthology vol. 1 Soprano and vol. 4 Baritone respectively.

Recording
Conte: The Gift of the Magi – Aimee Puentes (Della), Elena Bocharova (Maggie), Tim Krol (Jim), Chad Runyon (Henry), Branden Smith, Aaron DiPiazza, Gary Sorenson (Magi); San Francisco Conservatory New Music Ensemble; Nicole Paiement (conductor). Label: Arsis Records

See also
 List of Christmas operas

Notes and references

Sources
American Record Guide (May 2002). "Conte: The Gift of the Magi
Eidemiller,  Maryann Gogniat (December 3, 2005). "'Magi' gets operatic treatment". Pittsburgh Tribune-Review 
Gerbrandt, Carl (2006). Sacred Music Drama: The Producer's Guide, 2nd edition. AuthorHouse.

External links
Gift of the Magi on the official website of the composer 

English-language operas
Chamber operas
Christmas operas
Operas
1997 operas
One-act operas
Adaptations of works by O. Henry